Sex Dreams and Denim Jeans is the debut studio album by French-American singer Uffie. It was released on June 14, 2010, by Ed Banger Records and Because Music. Produced by Feadz, J-Mat, Mr. Oizo, Mirwais and Sebastian, the album features guest appearances by Pharrell Williams and Mattie Safer of The Rapture, includes an "adaptation" of The Velvet Underground's "Rock & Roll" and a cover of Siouxsie and the Banshees' "Hong Kong Garden", which Uffie cited as one of her favorite songs.

The album peaked at number 17 on the Billboard Dance/Electronic Albums chart and number 18 on the UK Dance Albums Chart. Although reviews for the album were mixed, it was included on year-end critics' lists by several publications and was nominated at the 2011 French Victoires de la Musique for Best Electronic Album.

In 2012 it was awarded a silver certification from the Independent Music Companies Association which indicated sales of at least 20,000 copies throughout Europe.

Since the release of the album, Uffie's music is said to have "had a lasting and widespread influence in the 2010s".

Release

Uffie's record label Ed Banger Records first stated in late 2006 that her debut album would be released "mid-to-late 2007", then "sometime in 2008". Hectic traveling and touring schedules, her marriage and divorce, news of her pregnancy and growing as an artist delayed the release of the album. She stated that her new sound is very different with a much more mature sound and there would be more singing on the album than her previous EPs. She describes the album as "schizophrenic" and "worth the wait". On October 3, 2009, Busy P, founder and owner of Ed Banger Records, stated that Uffie's album had just been completed and was due out in spring 2010. Feadz, J-Mat, Mr. Oizo, Mirwais and Sebastian served as producers on the album, while both Pharrell Williams and Mattie Safer from The Rapture made guest appearances.

Before the release of the album there was a contract dispute between Uffie and Lou Reed as to who would be credited as the writer of the title track, "Sex Dreams and Denim Jeans", which once again delayed the album from "early 2010" to June 15, 2010. The track uses an instrumental sample of The Velvet Underground's song "Rock & Roll" and the only way Reed would allow her to use the sample was by calling "Sex Dreams and Denim Jeans" an "adaptation" of "Rock & Roll" and receiving the sole credit as the writer of the song as well. This dispute delayed the album by about six months; Uffie branded Reed "fucking difficult", and when asked if he had heard the song, she stated, "Yes he has, he had to clear it. And it was a very not nice experience dealing with him, I have to say. [...] I don't know what this guy's problem is but on the credits I think it even says something like he wrote it. He gets everything."

In a later interview with BBC Radio 1, Uffie stated that the album was heavily acid-influenced and that Mirwais produced five tracks, while Feadz, Mr. Oizo and Sebastian produced a couple of tracks each. She also went on to refer to the album as "the end of my crazy youth and the intro to my adult life." "Pop the Glock", "First Love" and "Brand New Car" were all previously released as singles at least three years prior to the album's release.

Singles
"MCs Can Kiss" was the first single released from Sex Dreams and Denim Jeans and was released on January 12, 2010 to positive reviews from critics, describing it as "an old school soundclash of heavy beats and sharp rhymes" and stating it "shows off the French-American's ballsy schtick to full effect." Gigwise called the song a "razor-sharp lyrical assault with enough bombast to fuel the war in Afghanistan", while BBC Music dubbed it a "sarky bling-killing single". "MCs Can Kiss" peaked at number 48 on the Japan Hot 100 and at number 97 in France.

The lead single from Sex Dreams and Denim Jeans, "ADD SUV" (featuring Pharrell Williams), premiered on BBC Radio 1 on April 15, 2010. "ADD SUV" was described as being about "[p]oking fun at the rap fraternity's obsession with possessions, particularly their cars", while Uffie stated that the song was inspired by the 1967 film Valley of the Dolls. A music video for "ADD SUV", filmed in Los Angeles and starring both Uffie and Williams, was directed by Nathalie Canguilhem and released on June 14, 2010. The single was praised by critics from the New York Post, Prefix, Spin, and BBC, and peaked at number 28 on the UK Independent Singles Chart. Singles "MCs Can Kiss", "ADD SUV", "First Love" and "Pop the Glock" also managed to chart in various countries such as France, Japan, and the UK.

Ed Banger Records confirmed through their Facebook page on August 11, 2010, that Uffie's next single to be released would be "Difficult", produced by label-mate and friend Sebastian. It was later announced that "Difficult" would be released as an EP on October 18, 2010, containing remixes by Sebastian and Azari & III. A music video for the single was also announced to be released on October 6, 2010.

Track listing

Notes
  Fabien "Feadz" Pianta and Quentin "Mr. Oizo" Dupieux are credited as songwriters on "MCs Can Kiss" in the liner notes of Sex Dreams and Denim Jeans, while the liner notes of the "MCs Can Kiss" single credit Uffie and Feadz as songwriters.
  signifies a remixer

Sample credits
 "Pop the Glock" samples "Top Billin'" by Audio Two.
 "MCs Can Kiss" includes samples of "Bite This" by Roxanne Shanté and "Night Drive" by Giorgio Moroder.
 "Difficult" includes a sample of "Love of the Hurtin' Kind" by Claudja Barry.
 "First Love" includes a sample of "Don't Go" by F. R. David.
 "Sex Dreams and Denim Jeans" is an adaptation of "Rock & Roll" written by Lou Reed.

Personnel
Credits adapted from the liner notes of Sex Dreams and Denim Jeans.

Musicians

 Uffie – vocals
 Pharrell Williams – vocals 
 Mirwais – keyboards, programming 
 Hal Ritson – keyboards ; programming ; backing vocals, additional guitar 
 Richard Adlam – keyboards ; programming ; drums ; backing vocals ; percussion 
 Guthrie Govan – bass, guitars 
 Mattie Safer – vocals

Technical

 Feadz – production 
 J-Mat – production 
 Mr. Oizo – production 
 Mirwais – production, mixing 
 Hal Ritson – sample recreation production 
 Richard Adlam – sample recreation production 
 Sebastian – production

Artwork
 Nathalie Canguilhem – art direction
 Will Goodman – design
 Ysa Pérez – photography

Charts

Release history

References

2010 debut albums
Because Music albums
Elektra Records albums
Uffie albums